The 2021–22 Championnat National season was the 29th season since the establishment of the Championnat National, and the 23rd in its current format, which serves as the third division of the French football league system.

Team changes 
Team changes from the 2020–21 Championnat National.

To National
Promoted from 2020–21 Championnat National 2
None. Season not completed due to COVID-19 pandemic.

Promoted from 2019–20 Championnat National 2
Sedan

Relegated from Ligue 2
Châteauroux
Chambly

From National
Relegated to National 2
SC Lyon

Promoted to Ligue 2
Bastia
Quevilly-Rouen

Stadia and locations

Number of teams by regions

Professional status
Châteauroux and Chambly retain their professional status having just been relegated to Championnat National. Le Mans and Orléans retain their professional status under section 102 of the administrative rules of the LFP. Red Star have been granted an exemption from section 102 rules due to the health situation, and also retain their professional status.

League table

Promotion play-offs
A promotion play-off will be held at the end of the season between the 18th-placed team of the 2021–22 Ligue 2 and the 3rd-placed team of the 2021–22 Championnat National. This will be played over two legs on 26 and 29 May.

First leg

Second leg 

Quevilly-Rouen won 5–1 on aggregate and therefore both clubs remained in their respective leagues.

Post-season changes
On 21 June 2022, the Direction Nationale du Contrôle de Gestion ruled that Bourg-Péronnas were to be relegated to Championnat National 2 for the 2022–23 season, due to financial mismanagement. On 1 July 2022, the decision was overturned at the appeal hearing.

On 28 June 2022, the DNCG further ruled that Sète would be relegated to Championnat National 2 for the 2022–23 season, due to financial mismanagement. On 12 July 2022, the decision was upheld at the appeal hearing, meaning Bastia-Borgo were reprieved from relegation.

Top scorers

References

Championnat National seasons
3
France